Iosif Arshakovich Andriasov, also Ovsep Andreasian (7 April 1933 in Moscow – 16 November 2000 in New York City), was a composer-symphonist, a moral philosopher, and a teacher.

Iosif Andriasov was born in Moscow on April 7, 1933, to an Armenian family. He is a graduate of Moscow Conservatory, where he studied composition with Professor Evgeny Golubev. In 1964, Andriasov became a member of the Union of Soviet Composers on the recommendation of Dmitri Shostakovich, from whom his music obviously is inspired, whilst still maintaining an original quality. The Head of the Armenian-Gregorian Church, Vazgen I, Catolikos of All Armenians, awarded Iosif Andriasov the Special Charter with Recognition and Blessing for his contributions to music and ethics. In 1974, for his Second Symphony, Iosif Andriasov won the Soviet Composers' Competition to represent Soviet music at the USSR National Celebration. Iosif Andriasov received many international awards in recognition of his services to music and ethics. His wife is musicologist Marta Andriasova and son New York born composer Arshak Andriasov.

Selected works 
. String Quartet, Op.1

. Musical Sketch for Flute and String Orchestra, Op.4

. Piano Trio, Op. 7

. Symphony No. 1, Op. 12

. Clarinet Concertino, Op. 27

. Spring, for String Quartet, Op.32

References

External links
Official website http://www.andriasovstore.com/

1933 births
2000 deaths
Musicians from Moscow
Soviet Armenians
Ethnic Armenian composers
Armenian philosophers
Soviet composers
Soviet male composers
Soviet philosophers
20th-century Russian philosophers
Moscow Conservatory alumni
20th-century classical musicians
20th-century composers
20th-century Russian male musicians